Shambhu Charan Godsora was an Indian politician. He was a Member of Parliament, representing Singhbhum, Bihar in the Lok Sabha the lower house of India's Parliament as a member of the Jharkhand Party.

References

External links
Official biographical sketch in Parliament of India website

Lok Sabha members from Bihar
Jharkhand Party politicians
India MPs 1957–1962
1926 births
Possibly living people